Gavmishabad-e Sheykh Hosun (also Romanized as Gāvmīshābād-e Sheykh Ḩosūn) is a village in Miyan Ab-e Shomali Rural District, in the Central District of Shushtar County, Khuzestan Province, Iran. At the 2006 census, its population was 68, in 15 families.

References 

Populated places in Shushtar County